Keng-Say is a village in Osh Region of Kyrgyzstan. It is part of the Kara-Suu District. Its population was 6,604 in 2021.

Population

References

Populated places in Osh Region